Israel Rodríguez Sánchez, born in Puerto Rico on August 29, 1974, and a B.A. and M.A. graduate of the University of Puerto Rico (UPR) School of Communications, is a Puerto Rican journalist whose professional activities have crossed over to academia.

One of the top political correspondents for El Nuevo Día, Puerto Rico's top daily newspaper, since January 2005 Rodríguez has also been a professor at the UPR at Río Piedras' School of Communications, where he not only teaches communications courses but also organizes journalistic forums.  Even though he's only in his early 30s, he is already considered a mentor to journalism students as well as young, budding journalists.

A standing-room-only forum held at UPR in October 2007 and organized and moderated by him featured two top island politicians---then Senate President Kenneth McClintock and Rep. Jorge Colberg as well as three prominent journalists, including attorney Magdalys Rodríguez, an El Nuevo Día consultant, as well as TV reporter and radio commentator  Rafael Lenín López and radio journalist Maribel Hernández.

His first book on Puerto Rico journalism, Escándalo Político y Periodismo en Puerto Rico, was published in November, 2007.  He is collaborating with attorney and former journalist Magdalys Rodríguez on a book on the exercise of power at the Legislative Assembly of Puerto Rico.

He is currently drafting his thesis to complete his doctorate at Universidad Complutense in Madrid, Spain.

After President Obama announced on December 17, 2014 the easing of relations with Cuba, Rodríguez was assigned as El Nuevo Día's special correspondent to Havana, where he spent over a week in late 2014 preparing special reports from the Cuban capital.

References

Puerto Rican journalists
Puerto Rican columnists
Puerto Rican educators
University of Puerto Rico alumni
Living people
1974 births